Bradfords is an online business selling cakes and hampers. 

The business was originally a chain of bakeries operating throughout the Greater Glasgow area of Scotland, with the main bakery and head office in Thornliebank. The company had 15 retail outlets and also owned Miss Cranston's tearooms. They produce traditional hand-crafted products as well as more specialised items such as chocolates, Danish pastries, biscuits, jams and chutneys. The retail business went into liquidation in 2003. It re-emerged as an on-line business trading under the name "Bradfords Bakers & Gifts Ltd" under the same family ownership following the liquidation of the original business.

References

Scottish brands
Food and drink companies of Scotland
Companies based in Glasgow
Bakeries of the United Kingdom
1924 establishments in Scotland
Retail companies established in 1924
British companies established in 1924
Food and drink companies established in 1924
Condiment companies